Jaime Sierra Mateos (born 18 March 1998) is a Spanish footballer who plays for UD Logroñés as a central midfielder.

Club career
Born in Madrid, Sierra joined Real Madrid's youth setup in 2004, from EF Carabanchel. In July 2014, he moved to Valencia CF, being assigned to the Juvenil squad.

In August 2017, free agent Sierra moved to CD Leganés, being assigned to the reserves in Tercera División. He made his senior debut late in the month, coming on as a second-half substitute in a 3–2 away win against AD Alcorcón B.

Sierra made his first team – and La Liga – debut on 28 January 2018, replacing José Naranjo in a 3–2 home win against RCD Espanyol.

References

External links
Leganés profile 

1998 births
Living people
Footballers from Madrid
Spanish footballers
Association football midfielders
La Liga players
Tercera División players
CD Leganés B players
CD Leganés players
UD Logroñés players